James Russell (1 May 1897 – 8 January 2001) was an Irish hurler who played at club level with Shamrocks and at inter-county level with the Cork senior hurling team.

Career

Russell was first introduced to hurling as a schoolboy. He played his first game for the Shamrocks club in 1912 and won a Cork IHC title after a defeat of Castletownroche in 1915. He also lined out the following year when Shamrocks were beaten by Midleton in the senior final. Russell joined the Cork senior hurling team in 1920 and was an unused substitute in that year's All-Ireland final defeat by Dublin. He later lined out with the Cork junior hurling team.

Personal life and death

Russell was born in Shanbally, County Cork in May 1897. After his national schooling at Ringaskiddy, he trained to be a fitter-turner at the Royal Navy Dockyard in Haulbowline. Russell emigrated to New York City in 1926. After initially working as a fitter he joined the U.S. Civil Service in 1937. Russell returned to Cork after his retirement in 1961. He died at a nursing home in Rochestown on 8 January 2001, aged 103.

Honours

Shamrocks
Cork Intermediate Hurling Championship: 1915

Cork
Munster Senior Hurling Championship: 1920

References

1897 births
2001 deaths
Shamrocks (Cork) hurlers
Cork inter-county hurlers
Irish centenarians